David Berlinski (born 1942) is an American author who has written books about mathematics and the history of science as well as fiction. An opponent of evolution, he is a senior fellow of the Discovery Institute's Center for Science and Culture, an organization which promotes the pseudoscience of intelligent design.

Early life 
David Berlinski was born in the United States in 1942 to German-born Jewish refugees who had emigrated to New York City after escaping from France while the Vichy government was collaborating with the Germans. His father was Herman Berlinski, a composer, organist, pianist, musicologist and choir conductor, and his mother was Sina Berlinski (née Goldfein), a pianist, piano teacher and voice coach. Both were born and raised in Leipzig, where they studied at the Conservatory, before fleeing to Paris, where they were married and undertook further studies. German was David Berlinski's first spoken language. He earned his BA from Columbia University and PhD in philosophy from Princeton University.

Academic career 
After his PhD, Berlinski was a research assistant in the Department of Biology at Columbia University. He has taught philosophy, mathematics and English at Stanford University, Rutgers, the City University of New York and the Université de Paris. He was a research fellow at the International Institute for Applied Systems Analysis (IIASA) in Austria and the Institut des Hautes Études Scientifiques (IHES) in France.

Author

Mathematics and biology
Berlinski has written works on systems analysis, the history of differential topology, analytic philosophy, and the philosophy of mathematics.  Berlinski has authored books for the general public on mathematics and the history of mathematics.  These include A Tour of the Calculus (1995) on calculus, The Advent of the Algorithm (2000) on algorithms, Newton's Gift (2000) on Isaac Newton, and Infinite Ascent: A Short History of Mathematics (2005).  Another book, The Secrets of the Vaulted Sky (2003), aimed to redeem astrology as "rationalistic"; Publishers Weekly described the book as offering "self-consciously literary vignettes ... ostentatious erudition and metaphysical pseudo-profundities". In Black Mischief (1988), Berlinski wrote "Our paper became a monograph. When we had completed the details, we rewrote everything so that no one could tell how we came upon our ideas or why. This is the standard in mathematics."

Berlinski's books have received mixed reviews. Newton's Gift, The King of Infinite Space and The Advent of the Algorithm were criticized on MathSciNet for containing historical and mathematical inaccuracies. While the Mathematical Association of America review of A Tour of the Calculus by Fernando Q. Gouvêa recommended that professors have students read the book to appreciate the overarching historical and philosophical picture of calculus, a review in The Mathematical Gazette criticized it for inaccuracy and lack of clarity, declaring, "I haven't learned anything from [Berlinski's] book except that the novel of mathematics is best written in another style." Likewise, a review in the Notices of the AMS found that Berlinski's metaphor-heavy prose made his "tour" of calculus like a trip along the Amazon River, isolated in an air-conditioned boat with tour guides who are "chatty and slightly manic, willing to invent a bit when certain knowledge runs out."

Collaborations
Berlinski, along with fellow Discovery Institute associates Michael Behe and William A. Dembski, tutored Ann Coulter on science and evolution for her book Godless: The Church of Liberalism (2006).

Berlinski was a longtime friend of Marcel-Paul Schützenberger (1920–1996), with whom he collaborated on an unfinished and unpublished mathematically based manuscript that he described as being "devoted to the Darwinian theory of evolution". Berlinski dedicated The Advent of the Algorithm to Schützenberger.

Fiction
He is the author of several detective novels featuring private investigator Aaron Asherfeld: A Clean Sweep (1993), Less Than Meets the Eye (1994) and The Body Shop (1996), and a number of shorter works of fiction and non-fiction.

Opposition to evolution 
An opponent of biological evolution, Berlinski is a senior fellow of the Discovery Institute's Center for Science and Culture, a Seattle-based think tank that is a hub of the pseudoscientific intelligent design movement. Berlinski shares the movement's rejection of the evidence for evolution, but does not avow intelligent design and describes his relationship with the idea as: "warm but distant. It's the same attitude that I display in public toward my ex-wives." Berlinski is a critic of evolution, yet, "Unlike his colleagues at the Discovery Institute,...[he] refuses to theorize about the origin of life."

Personal life 
Berlinski's daughter Claire Berlinski is a journalist and his son Mischa Berlinski is a writer.

Bibliography

Non-fiction books

Fiction books

Articles in peer-reviewed journals

Articles in journals and newspapers

  Part 2 and part 3 published in Synthese, 36 (3) (November 1977), and 37 (2) (February 1978), respectively.

Notes

References

External links

 
 
 

1942 births
Living people
Jewish creationists
Discovery Institute fellows and advisors
Jewish American writers
American people of German-Jewish descent
Columbia College (New York) alumni
Princeton University alumni
Secular Jews
Jewish agnostics
American agnostics
Writers from Paris
Berlinski family